Lankao County is a county of Kaifeng, Henan, China.

It was the site of the Battle of Lanfeng during the Second Sino-Japanese War.

Administrative divisions
As 2012, this county is divided to 5 towns and 11 townships.
Towns

Townships

Climate

Transportation 
China National Highway 220
Lankao South Railway Station

References

External links
Official website of Lankao Government

County-level divisions of Henan
Kaifeng